The Louis Volin House is a historic two-story house in Volin, South Dakota. It was built in 1875 for Louis Volin, an immigrant from Quebec, Canada who founded the town of Volin in what was then known as the Dakota Territory. The facade was designed in the Queen Anne and Neocolonial architectural styles. The house has been listed on the National Register of Historic Places since April 16, 1980.

References

National Register of Historic Places in Yankton County, South Dakota
Houses completed in 1875
Queen Anne architecture in South Dakota
Colonial Revival architecture in South Dakota
1875 establishments in Dakota Territory